Petrophonics is the fifth studio album by rock band Birdsongs of the Mesozoic. It was released on September 19, 2000 through Cuneiform Records.

Track listing

Personnel 
Birdsongs of the Mesozoic
Michael Bierylo – guitar, percussion
Ken Field – alto saxophone, soprano saxophone, flute, synthesizer, percussion
Erik Lindgren – piano, organ, synthesizer, sampler, drum programming, percussion, photography
Rick Scott – clarinet, synthesizer, electronic drums, percussion
Additional musicians and production
Birdsongs of the Mesozoic – production

References

2000 albums
Birdsongs of the Mesozoic albums
Cuneiform Records albums